The Verhofstadt II Government was the federal government of Belgium from 12 July 2003 to 21 December 2007.

It was the second government headed by Prime Minister Guy Verhofstadt (VLD). It was formed after the 2003 general election. It consisted of the Flemish Liberals and Democrats (VLD), the French-speaking Liberal Reformist Party (MR), the Flemish Socialist Party (SP.a) and the French-speaking Socialist Party (PS). Because it comprised liberals and socialists it was also known as a "purple" coalition. It was a continuation of the Verhofstadt I Government but without the Green parties.

Original Composition 2003-2004

Reshuffles
On September 25, 2003, Temsamani had to resign because she had lied about a diploma she received
On February 12, 2004, Jacques Simonet resigned to become Minister-President of Brussels, he was replaced by Didier Donfut (PS).

Composition after the 2004 Regional elections
The 2004 Regional elections saw a fundamental reshuffle to the federal government as various federal ministers joined regional governments after these elections. The federal government after this date is often called Verhofstadt IIbis.

2004 Reshuffles
 Louis Michel became European Commissioner and was replaced as Deputy Prime Minister by Didier Reynders and as Foreign Minister by Karel De Gucht (VLD).
 Frank Vandenbroucke joined the Flemish Government and was replaced as minister of Labour by Freya Van den Bossche who kept Consumer Affairs. Bruno Tobback (SP.a) became minister taking over Environment from Freya Van den Bossche and Pensions from Vandenbroucke.
 Fientje Moerman joined the Flemish Government and was replaced as minister for Economy, Energy, Foreign Trade and Scientific Research by Marc Verwilghen, who in turn was succeeded as minister of Development Cooperation by Armand De Decker (MR).
 Bert Anciaux joined the Flemish Government and was succeeded as minister for Mobility by Renaat Landuyt (SP.a)
 Marie Arena became Minister-President of the French Community government and was replaced as minister by Christian Dupont (PS)
 Els Van Weert (Spirit) became state secretary for Sustainable Development
 Isabelle Simonis was replaced by Gisèle Mandaila Malamba (MR) as state secretary for Family and Persons with a handicap

Later Reshuffles
 On October 15, 2005, Johan Vande Lanotte resigned to become Chairman of the SP.a. He was replaced as Deputy Prime Minister and Minister for the Budget by Freya Van den Bossche, who kept Consumer Affairs. Peter Vanvelthoven was promoted to Minister of Labour and Informatisation and Bruno Tuybens (SP.a) became state secretary for Public Enterprises.
 After the 2007 general elections the Verhofstadt II Government functioned as a caretaker government until December 2007. During that periode the following reshuffling took place:
On July 15, 2007, Armand De Decker became Chairman of the Belgian Senate. His competence (Development Cooperation) was taken over by Sabine Laruelle and Hervé Jamar was promoted to minister.
In July 2007 Rudy Demotte became Minister-President of the Walloon Government. His competences were taken over by Didier Donfut, who was promoted to minister.

Belgian governments
2003 establishments in Belgium
2007 disestablishments in Belgium
Cabinets established in 2003
Cabinets disestablished in 2007
Grand coalition governments